Sumer is a 1981 video game published by Crystal Computer for Apple II, Atari 8-bit family, Commodore PET, and TRS-80.

Contents
Sumer is a game in which the player tries to establish a kingdom by managing it as it grows.

Reception
Jon Mishcon reviewed Sumer in The Space Gamer No. 40. Mishcon commented that "If you enjoy multiparameter city-state type games then I recommend you avoid this. Buy Santa Paravia instead."

References

1981 video games
Apple II games
Atari 8-bit family games
Commodore PET games
Single-player video games
TRS-80 games
Turn-based strategy video games
Video games developed in the United States